Wayne Evans (born 3 June 1984) is a Welsh rugby union footballer who plays scrum half and has gained international honours with Wales under 18s, 21s and Sevens (Dubai, George, Commonwealth Games, Hong Kong, Adelaide, London and Murreyfield).

Evans started playing rugby St Clears and Narberth at junior level, before playing for the youth team at Carmarthen Quins. In 2001, Evans played for the Scarlets Academy and Carmarthen Quins Seniors XV. Cardiff Blues signed Evans in 2005, where he was also involved in playing for Pontypridd RFC prior to joining Newport Gwent Dragons.

Evans signed an extended contract with Newport Gwent Dragons in January 2010.

In July 2014 Evans joined Coventry

References

External links
Newport Gwent Dragons profile
Wales profile
Wayne Evans on Ponty.net
Skysports

Welsh rugby union players
Pontypridd RFC players
Cardiff Rugby players
Dragons RFC players
1984 births
Living people
Rugby union players from Carmarthen
Rugby sevens players at the 2006 Commonwealth Games
Commonwealth Games rugby sevens players of Wales